NCAA basketball championship may refer to:

NCAA Basketball Championship (Philippines)
NCAA basketball tournament (disambiguation)

See also
List of NCAA basketball champions (disambiguation)